Pencho Ivanov Zlatev (2 November 1881 – 24 July 1948), also known as Petko Ivanov Zlatev, was a Bulgarian general and politician in the years before the Second World War.

Biography

Zlatev was born in Elena, Bulgaria. He became the Inspector-General of the Cavalry. Zlatev was also a member of the Military League, a right-wing group that had close links to Zveno. Following the 1934 coup by this movement, Zlatev became Minister of Defence, although as a staunch monarchist he became wary of the growing republican sentiments expressed by some members of the new regime.  As a result, Tsar Boris III orchestrated a counter-coup against the new regime and placed Zlatev as Prime Minister on 22 January 1935. Zlatev, who was only intended as a strong military presence in the immediate aftermath of the coup, was quickly replaced once Boris' control was assured, whilst the decision to imprison Kimon Georgiev and Aleksandar Tsankov also weakened Zlatev's position.

See also

List of Bulgarian generals in the Kingdom of Bulgaria

References

 

1881 births
1948 deaths
People from Elena, Bulgaria
Prime Ministers of Bulgaria
Eastern Orthodox Christians from Bulgaria
Bulgarian military personnel of the Balkan Wars
Bulgarian military personnel of World War I
Recipients of the Order of Bravery
Recipients of the Order of Military Merit (Bulgaria)
Recipients of the Iron Cross (1914), 2nd class
Bulgarian generals
Bulgarian monarchists
Defence ministers of Bulgaria